Robert William Woodruff (born 9 November 1940) is an English former professional footballer.

Born in Highworth, Wiltshire, Woodruff began his career at his hometown club Swindon Town where he broke into the first team at 18. He was a regular in the side before joining Wolves in 1964 for forty thousand pounds. During this time he gained a reputation as a long-throw specialist but eventually moved on two years later to Crystal Palace. He helped take Palace to division one but only played a handful of matches in the top flight before being allowed to leave and join Cardiff City for £25,000. He was signed as a replacement for Barrie Jones. He scored six goals in six games when asked to play as a centre forward. He was released in 1974 and joined neighbours Newport County. He later finished his career playing in Welsh League football.

After retiring, he took positions as both youth coach and reserve team coach at Cardiff, also later working as a social worker. Woodruff's son, Robert Woodruff, also played for Cardiff City, Swindon Town, Newport County and Cork City before having a successful career in Belgium. Robert scored the first league goal for Cork City FC in 1984.

References

External links

1940 births
Living people
English footballers
People from Highworth
Swindon Town F.C. players
Wolverhampton Wanderers F.C. players
Crystal Palace F.C. players
Cardiff City F.C. players
Gloucester City A.F.C. players
Newport County A.F.C. players
English Football League players
Association football midfielders